Gigen is a village in northern Bulgaria, part of Gulyantsi Municipality, Pleven Province. It is located near the  Danube River, close to the place where the Iskar River empties into it, opposite the Romanian town of Corabia.

Gigen is most famous for being built on the site of the important Roman colony of Oescus. The extensive ruins are located in the northwestern part of the village and were first associated with the ancient colony in the end of the 17th century. A bridge, built or reconstructed by Constantine I and named Constantine's Bridge in his honour, linked Oescus with Sucidava (modern Corabia) across the Danube in the 4th century.

Gigen is also known for an anti-Bogomil inscription in Old Bulgarian dating to the 10th century, the rule of Tsar Peter I of Bulgaria. The text was discovered in the old village church, inscribed on a stone block 85 centimetres in width. According to the scientifically accepted reading, the text of the inscription is as follows:

, Gigen has a population of 2,192 inhabitants.

Honour
Gigen Peak on Graham Land in Antarctica is named after the village.

References

Villages in Pleven Province
Old Bulgarian inscriptions